Quta Willk'i (Aymara quta lake, willk'i gap, "lake gap", also spelled Kkota Willkki) is a   mountain in the Chilla-Kimsa Chata mountain range in the Andes of Bolivia. It lies in the La Paz Department, Ingavi Province, Guaqui Municipality. Quta Willk'i is situated north-west of the mountain Wanq'uni, north-east of Tanqa Tanqani and south-east of Qala Waxrani.

References 

Mountains of La Paz Department (Bolivia)